Jad Arslan (born August 22, 1996) is a former American soccer player who played as a midfielder for South Georgia Tormenta in the USL League One.

References

External links
 
 West Virginia Mountaineers profile

1996 births
Living people
American soccer players
Association football midfielders
People from Roswell, Georgia
Soccer players from Georgia (U.S. state)
Sportspeople from Fulton County, Georgia
Tormenta FC players
USL League One players
USL League Two players
West Virginia Mountaineers men's soccer players